Restless is an espionage novel written by William Boyd, published in 2006. It won the Costa Prize for fiction.

The novel depicts the tale of a young woman who discovers that her mother was recruited as a spy during World War II. The book continually switches between time periods and, in doing so, from first to third person.

According to the author, it is one of the first novels to deal with the British Security Coordination service in New York. The book gained general public interest when it was chosen for inclusion in 'Book Club 2007', on the UK television show Richard & Judy.

Plot summary
Eva, a young Russian woman, is recruited after her brother's death to work for the British secret service. During this time she falls for her mentor and boss, Lucas Romer. But all is not as it seems as Romer is working as a double agent which ultimately leads to the attempted murder of Eva, alongside the deaths of other agents.

The tale is interlinked with the story of Eva's daughter in the 1970s and how she comes to terms with the discovery of her mother's secret life. The setting of the novel is in London, Oxford, Scotland, continental Europe, and the United States.

Reception
Marianne MacDonald, for The Observer, said that Boyd's novel was "a good, rollicking read...Restless pulls you deep into the obscure, forgotten intricacies of wartime espionage, in particular the covert operations run by the British in America before Pearl Harbor".

David Mattin, reviewing Restless for The Independent, described the book's ending as "both page-turning and deft, leaving us with a moving feeling that it is our histories, and our ever-changing, private interpretations of them, that render us ultimately unknowable. Restless is that rare thing: a spy thriller from a first-rate narrative intelligence."

Adaptation
In December 2012 the BBC aired a two-part TV adaptation based on the novel. It was produced by Hilary Bevan Jones, directed by Edward Hall and featured Hayley Atwell, Rufus Sewell, Michelle Dockery, Michael Gambon and Charlotte Rampling.

References

Source
Boyd, William. Restless, Bloomsbury, 2006,

External links
 
 
 William Boyd, winner of the 2006 Costa Novel Award, talks about his book, Restless. Costa Book Awards. 19 February 2007. Retrieved 10 April 2020.
 William Boyd reading a section from Restless (video) , Bloomsbury. 30 May 2008. Retrieved 10 April 2020.

2006 British novels
Bloomsbury Publishing books
British spy novels
Costa Book Award-winning works
Fiction set in 1976
British novels adapted into television shows
Novels by William Boyd (writer)
Novels set in London
Novels set in Oxford
Novels set in Scotland
Novels set in the United States